Pang: Magical Michael is a puzzle-platform game, released on September 17, 2010 for Nintendo DS that was created by Mitchell Corporation and published in Europe and Australia by Rising Star Games. A release in the United States was planned, but later cancelled.  It offers features such as Tour Mode and Panic Mode, as well as dual-screen support, local wireless multiplayer battles, online leaderboards, achievements and a special touchscreen mode that can be unlocked later in the game. It shares some DNA with the previous game in the series: the arcade game Mighty! Pang.

Reception 

Pang: Magical Michael has received positive scores from media sources. On review aggregator website GameRankings, it received a score of 76.8%, while on Metacritic, Pang: Magical Michael has a rating of 74%. Nintendo Life gave it 8/10 stating that the game "is an excellent continuation of the Pang series, one designed for both entry-level and experienced players alike. It can either be treated as a simple challenge, a quest to beat and defeat all of the stages presented, or an invitation to explore and get as much out of it as possible."

References

External links
Official website (archived)
Mitchell Corporation website 

2010 video games
Nintendo DS games
Nintendo DS-only games
Puzzle-platform games
Video games developed in Japan
Multiplayer and single-player video games
Rising Star Games games
Mitchell Corporation games